Kenneth Bryan Davis (born September 12, 1948) is an American former basketball player.

Davis was born in Slat, Kentucky. After his collegiate career as a small college All-American at Georgetown College, where he was a member of the Kappa Alpha Order, and a short stint with the Marathon Oil AAU team, Davis was named Captain of the U.S. national team in the 1972 Olympics. In the aftermath of the controversial finish to the gold medal game, Davis famously led the United States team in a refusal to accept the silver medal and has a provision in his will that neither his wife nor children may accept the medal after his death. After his basketball career ended, Davis became and still is a sales representative for Converse (39 years) and also is a noted motivational speaker residing in Garrard County, Kentucky.

Davis was drafted by the New York Knicks in the eleventh round of the 1971 NBA draft. He never played professionally, however.

References

1948 births
Living people
American men's basketball players
Basketball players from Kentucky
Basketball players at the 1972 Summer Olympics
Basketball players at the 1971 Pan American Games
Georgetown Tigers men's basketball players
Medalists at the 1972 Summer Olympics
New York Knicks draft picks
Olympic silver medalists for the United States in basketball
People from Wayne County, Kentucky
People from Garrard County, Kentucky
Point guards
Pan American Games competitors for the United States